The Double E is a 1977 book by Percival Goodman about utopian planning that accounts for economy and ecology in a time of scarcity.

See also 

 Communitas (book)

References

External links 

 

1977 non-fiction books
English-language books
Anchor Books books